Ecnomiohyla fimbrimembra is a species of frog in the family Hylidae.
It is found in Costa Rica and Panama.
Its natural habitat is subtropical or tropical moist montane forests.
It is threatened by habitat loss and the spread of chytridiomycosis.

References

Ecnomiohyla
Amphibians described in 1948
Taxonomy articles created by Polbot